Charles John Seghers (also written as Charles-Jean Seghers; 26 December 1839 – 28 November 1886) was a Belgian clergyman and missionary bishop. He is considered to be the founder of the Alaska Mission.

Biography

Early years and formation
Seghers was born at Ghent, in Belgium.

He attended school at the Jesuit High School of Ste. Barbe in Ghent, and the American College in Leuven. Ordained priest in May 1863 in Mechlin, Belgium, he left soon after to begin his missionary work in the area of Vancouver, British Columbia, Canada in November of that year.

Missionary work
While there, he founded St. Joseph's Hospital in Victoria, British Columbia.  He returned to Rome to take part in the First Vatican Council.  He was appointed as a diocesan administrator in 1871, and later Bishop of Vancouver Island (now Bishop of Victoria) on 29 June 1873.  He made his first visit to Alaska, which was included in his diocese, three weeks later.  He made five visits to Alaska during his term as bishop.  In June 1878, he left Nulato, Alaska, where he had set up a temporary headquarters, and set sail to San Francisco, where he learned he had been appointed Coadjutor Archbishop of Oregon City.  Although he personally would have preferred remaining a missionary, he accepted the appointment.  He would later become the archbishop in 1880.  In that capacity, he visited Rome in 1883, and took part that year in the Third Plenary Council of Baltimore.  After petitioning Pope Leo XIII to be reassigned to Vancouver again, his wish was granted. This allowed him to return to missionary work. He established missions in Juneau and Sitka, and also founded a school and hospital in Juneau.

Death

In 1886, with two Jesuit priests, Pascal Tosi and Aloysius Robaut, and one layman, Frank Fuller, he sailed from Victoria with the intention of reaching the upper Yukon. When they reached the confluence of the Yukon River and Stewart River, Seghers decided the other two priests should spend the winter there, while he and Fuller would press on to Nulato. Father Tosi expressed concerns about this proposal, noting that Fuller had displayed signs of emotional instability. Seghers acknowledged the concern, and how the lateness of the season would likely impact his work. He gave as his reasons for going ahead anyway as his wish to fulfill a promise made to the people of Nulato to return eight years earlier, and that there were stories that an Anglican priest, who was allegedly at St. Michael, Alaska, might arrive there and establish himself before Seghers. As they continued down the river, Seghers came to realize that, as traveling conditions and the boat deteriorated, Fuller's mind did as well.  On 16 October, he wrote in his diary: Peculiar conversation with (Fuller) in which, for the third time, he gives evidence of insanity. On 27 November, Seghers and Fuller, with two native guides they had acquired at Nuklukayet, decided to spend the night at the fish camp at what is today known as "Bishop's Rock". Seghers was in high spirits, laughing frequently, thinking that he would finally reach Nulato the following day. Fuller, however, remained sullen, looking suspiciously at his companions and remaining agitated throughout the night.

Between six and seven the next morning, the party arose and prepared for the final leg of their journey. As Seghers bent over to pick up his mittens, Fuller fired a single shot which killed Seghers instantly.

His body was taken to St. Michael for burial.  The next year, it was exhumed and sent to Victoria, and buried in the crypt at St. Andrew's Cathedral. He is still referred to as "the founder of the Alaska missions."

References

External links

 Biography at the Dictionary of Canadian Biography Online
 
 
 Seghers Collection at University of Victoria, Special Collections

1839 births
1886 deaths
Clergy from Ghent
Belgian expatriates in Canada
Belgian expatriates in the United States
19th-century Belgian Roman Catholic priests
19th-century Canadian Roman Catholic priests
Flemish priests
History of Catholicism in the United States
Catholic University of Leuven (1834–1968) alumni
American College of the Immaculate Conception alumni
Roman Catholic archbishops of Oregon City
19th-century Roman Catholic archbishops in the United States
Belgian emigrants to Canada
Oregon clergy
People from Juneau, Alaska
People from Sitka, Alaska
Roman Catholic bishops of Victoria in Canada